Otter Creek Township is a township in Linn County, Iowa.

History
Otter Creek Township was organized in 1844.

References

Townships in Linn County, Iowa
Townships in Iowa
1844 establishments in Iowa Territory